Sultan Ismail Petra Airport  is an airport that operates in Kota Bharu, a city in the state of Kelantan in Malaysia. The airport is named after Ismail Petra of Kelantan, the 28th Sultan of Kelantan, who ruled from 1979 to 2010. The present new terminal was officially opened in September 2002. The 12,000 m2 airport terminal has three aircraft stands, three aerobridges and is able to handle maximum capacity 1.45 million passengers. The airport consists of 9 check-in counters and offers flights between a total of 7 domestic destinations from Malaysia Airlines, AirAsia, Firefly, and Malindo Air. In 2014, this made it the busiest airport in the East Coast.

History
The airport is a former RAF Station, RAF Kota Bharu being a former British military airfield was the landing site of the Japanese invasion of Malaya during World War II. The scene of the first Japanese landing in Malaya on 8 December 1941.

After the war, the RAF military airfield was turned into a civilian airport. The passenger terminal was built and was known as Pengkalan Chepa Airport. After the terminal was expanded and a new building was built, it became known as Sultan Ismail Petra Airport, currently known as the old terminal of the Asia Pacific Flight Training flying school. In 1999, the government announced that the Sultan Ismail Petra Airport will be relocated to a new terminal building. The project started in September 2000 and was completed in June 2002 with a total cost of approximately RM55 million.

Relocating to the new building
The new terminal started operating from 12 September 2002. The building of Sultan Ismail Petra Airport, Kota Bharu is synonymous with the Islamic image of the state. This new terminal adopted the Moorish architecture. It has curved archways and is whiter in colour. The airport has a 12,000 square metre terminal with three aircraft stands and the most modern and technically advanced navigational aids. It has three aerobridges were salvaged from the old Subang Airport and refurbished, the terminal can accommodate up to 1.45 million passengers a year.

The new terminal of the airport is equipped with all of the modern facilities and services to meet the requirements of the innumerable travelers flying to and from the airport every day. The basic services available include information and customer service desk, medical services, wheelchair services for disabled travelers, police services and others. There are also porter services to help travelers with their luggage.

The major facilities that are found in this airport include shuttle and car rental representative counters, automated teller machines, currency exchange, gift shops, a KFC restaurant and small eating joints.

Expansion and developments
In the third quarter of 2008, Malaysia Airports Holdings Berhad built a new hangar, a new apron, new aircraft and helicopter parking bays and made taxiway improvements to cater to the growth of the Asia Pacific Flight Training flying school.

In October 2008, the government announced that it intends to extend the runway to a length of 2,400 m (7,874 ft). The Sultan Ismail Petra Airport serves Kota Bharu in Malaysia.

In May 2010, TRC Synergy Bhd's unit, Trans Resources Corp Sdn Bhd has secured a RM45.5 million contract to upgrade the Sultan Ismail Petra airport in Kota Bharu. TRC said its unit received the letter of acceptance from Wira Akil Holdings Sdn Bhd. The letter of acceptance from Wira Akil is subsequent to an award being given by the Ministry of Transport to Wira Akil whereby TRC is named as the sub-contractor for the project. The project started on 14 June 2010 and includes the construction of a taxiway, helicopter pads, a meteorological station and instrument landing system (ILS). The airport runway has been lengthened from 1,981 m to 2,400 m, and can accommodate the Boeing 737-800 and Airbus A320. All works are slated for completion by September 2011.

In February 2013, AirAsia Berhad and Firefly Sdn Bhd signed an agreement with Malaysia Airport Holdings Berhad (MAHB) to make Sultan Ismail Petra Airport their secondary hubs. 
In July 2015, Malaysia Airports is planning for the expansion Sultan Ismail Petra Airport in Kelantan, which has already exceeded its 1.5 million capacity. The building will be expanded to cater to 4 million passengers with a new multi-storey car park and additional aircraft stands (aerobridge) to cope with the expected increase in traffic in the coming decade.

In 2016 Malaysian federal budget (presented October 2015 ), Prime Minister announcement RM450 million for upgrading work under The Eleventh Malaysian Plan (2016–2020). Works include a new multi-storey car park, additional aircraft stands (aerobridge), apron expansion, enlargement runway/taxiway and a new terminal.

In October 2017, Malaysia Federal Government allocate RM 450 Million for upgrading the airport terminals.

Operating hours
The airport's normal operating hours are between 6:00 a.m. to 12:00 a.m. In the event of flight delays, the airport will remain open until the flight has taken off or has been cancelled.

Airlines and destinations

Traffic and statistics

Charter operators

MHS Aviation
 MHS Aviation is the leading provider of helicopter charter services in Sultan Ismail Petra Airport. Specializing in the movement of personnel, ferrying workers to and from offshore production platforms, equipment to and from the offshore installation and drilling rigs mainly for oil companies in the Malaysia-Thailand joint development area, South China Sea.

Weststar Aviation
 Weststar Aviation is the other charter offshore helicopter operator which operates from this airport to oil and gas companies in the Malaysia-Thailand joint development area, South China Sea.

Gallery

See also

List of airlines of Malaysia
List of airports in Malaysia
Busiest airports in Malaysia

References

 TRC Synergy unit wins SIP airport contract
 Relocates New Building
 KB Airport Enlargement Plan
 http://www.airliners.net
 Process of assessing, appointing consultants and contractors for the project to upgrade 
 

Firefly launches codeshare service with Malaysia Airlines

External links

 Sultan Ismail Petra Airport, Kota Bharu at Malaysia Airports Holdings Berhad
 
 
 Sultan Ismail Petra Airport Real Time Flight Schedule

Airports in Kelantan
Kota Bharu District